Bert Grant (12 July 1878 – 9 May 1951) was an American composer, pianist, and charter member of the American Society of Composers, Authors, and Publishers.

Biography
He was born in New York in 1878.

He worked for both Tin Pan Alley music publishers and Broadway theater companies.

He performed the first musical broadcast from Roselle Park, New Jersey.

Selected works
"Along the Rocky Road to Dublin"
"Arrah Go On, I'm Gonna Go Back To Oregon"
"Blue Bird"
"If I Knock the 'L' out of Kelly"
"In the Light of the Same Old Moon"
"The Trolley Car Swing"
"The Worst Is Yet to Come"
"When the Angelus is Ringing"
"When The Sun Goes Down In Romany: My Heart Goes Roaming Back To You"
"When You're Away"

Selected Broadway credits
Cinderella on Broadway

Awards
Seventeen of his songs are in the National Jukebox at the Library of Congress.

Notes

References

1878 births
1951 deaths
American male pianists
American musical theatre composers
American male composers
20th-century composers
19th-century American composers
19th-century American male musicians
20th-century American male musicians